A spectacular mark (also known as a specky, speckie, speccy, screamer or hanger) is a mark (or catch) in Australian rules football that typically involves a player jumping up on the back of another player.

The spectacular mark has become a much celebrated aspect of the sport. Many of the winners of the Australian Football League's annual Mark of the Year competition could be considered 'speckies', and commentators will often call an individual specky "a contender" in reference to this competition and the mark's likeliness to win it.

History 

Up until the early 1870s, Australian football was typically played low to the ground in congested rugby-style packs, and as such marks were generally taken on the chest. Occasional high marks were recorded; as early as 1862 a Melbourne Football Club player was praised for leaping "wonderfully high into the air" to mark the ball. Spectacular marks became more common in the 1880s, a time in which the game's style of play opened up and teams adopted positional structures resembling those in use today. Essendon's Charlie "Commotion" Pearson was a prominent high flyer of this period. An 1886 match report captured the excitement his aerial skills were generating: "Mr Pearson ... gave spectators many thrilling moments with his phenomenal leaps skyward. What a thrill the game would become as a spectacle if all players tried out this new idea." Albert Thurgood was a later exponent at the turn of the century. Dick Lee pulled down consistent high marks in the early 1900s. In South Australia Harold Oliver was considered the best exponent of the high flying mark prior to World War I.

It was only when the push in the back rule was introduced in 1897 that high flyers were protected from being pushed in mid air. This prevented potential serious injury. In 1904, "unintentional interference" paved the way for forwards to climb up opposition players' backs to take spectacular marks.

In the 1980s it became common for exponents of the spectacular mark to achieve extra elevation by levering or propping the hands or arms off the shoulders of opponents. According to the strict interpretation of the rules, this is in fact illegal interference. Sometimes, however, umpires would interpret in favour of the marking player if the interference was minor and deemed to be part of the jumping action. The AFL Rules Committee in 2007 effectively disallowed this type of spectacular mark altogether with a polarizing adjustment of the "hands on the back" rule. The intention was that players would use vertical leap only, however it did not increase the frequency of spectacular marks and resulted in many more frustrating free kicks. Many players use their arms and hands to balance naturally while in the air to gain greater height without pushing their opponent. As a result, the AFL relaxed this interpretation again in 2018.

In popular culture

The specky has been widely celebrated in Australian popular culture. The phrase "the big men fly" is invariably used to describe speckies and ruckmen contesting a ball-up, and has even spawned a play of the same name, written by Alan Hopgood and first staged in 1963. Alex Jesaulenko's famous specky in the 1970 VFL Grand Final gave rise to the catchphrase "Jesaulenko, You Beauty!". Songs such as Mike Brady's "Up There Cazaly" (1979) also celebrate the popular spectator phenomenon. In his poem "The High Mark", Bruce Dawe sees the specky as an expression of the human aspiration to fly. The poem ends with a footballer falling "back to Earth"—a "guernseyed Icarus".

There is also a series of football-themed children's novels, co-written by AFL star Garry Lyon and Felice Arena, named Specky Magee.

Stepladder 

In Australian slang, stepladder describes the player over whom another player marks to take a specky. In the past, fullbacks have been renowned for inadvertently acting as stepladders.

Some players have achieved fame for their role as stepladders of famous marks, such as Graeme "Jerker" Jenkin, who was the stepladder for Alex Jesaulenko's mark in the 1970 VFL Grand Final. Melbourne band TISM wrote the 1986 song "The Back Upon Which Jezza Jumped" about him.

Strong fullbacks Gary Pert, Mick Martyn, Chris Langford and Matthew Scarlett have been stepladders for speckies on multiple occasions.

Warren Tredrea was the stepladder of a rare Grand Final spectacular mark taken by Paul Chapman in the 2007 AFL Grand Final.

Gallery

References

External links 
 Personal Best - Jeremy Howe's favourite AFL marks on YouTube

Australian rules football terminology
Australian rules football tactics
Australian rules football skills